The Star was a London evening newspaper founded in 1888. It ceased publication in 1960 when it was merged with the Evening News, as part of the same takeover that saw the News Chronicle absorbed into the Daily Mail. For some years afterward, the merged paper was called The Evening News and Star.

Editors
1888: T. P. O'Connor
1890: Henry W. Massingham
1891: Ernest Parke
1908: James Douglas
1920: Wilson Pope
1930: Edward Chattaway
1936: Robin Cruickshank
1941: Arthur Leslie Cranfield
1957: Ralph McCarthy

Jack the Ripper
The Star achieved early prominence and high circulation by sensationalising the Whitechapel murders of 1888–1891. Some suspect that it wrote the Dear Boss letter that gave Jack the Ripper his name to boost circulation numbers.

References 

Daily Mail and General Trust
London newspapers
Publications established in 1888
Publications disestablished in 1960
Defunct newspapers published in the United Kingdom